The Madari are a Muslim community found  in a North India. They are a community of Muslim Faqirs.

See also 
 Madariyya (Sufi Tariqa)
 Shattari (Sufi Tariqa)

References 

Dom in India
Dom in Pakistan
Social groups of Haryana
Punjabi tribes
Muslim communities of Uttar Pradesh